Grapevine is the common name for plants of the genus Vitis. 

Other meanings include:

Terminology 
Grapevine (gossip), a term often used to describe a form of communication by means of gossip or rumor, as in "heard it through the grapevine"
Double fisherman's knot, used to join two lengths of rope
Leglock in wrestling, grappling, and martial arts; a practitioner wrapping their  legs around a limb or limbs of their opponent to gain control or leverage
Grapevine (dance move), dance figure in partner dancing

Media 
Grapevine (disk magazine), a disk magazine for the Commodore Amiga that was published by the demo scene group LSD
 The Grapevine, a website operated by The Root
 Grapevine (internet service provider), an internet service provider based in Canberra, Australia

The Reykjavík Grapevine, an English language Icelandic magazine based in Reykjavík
The Grapevine (newspaper), a publication in the Annapolis Valley, Nova Scotia
Homeless Grapevine, a street newspaper in Cleveland

Grapevine (TV series), a 1992 American program
 A segment on the TV show Special Report with Bret Baier

"I Heard It Through the Grapevine", a 1967 song recorded by various Motown artists
"Grapevine" (song) a 2018 song by Tiësto.

Places 
 The Grapevine, a road grade of Interstate 5 in California that leads up from Grapevine (1499 feet, 457 m) to Tejon Pass (4144 feet, 1263 m), connecting the California Central Valley with the Los Angeles area
Grapevine, California
Grapevine, Arkansas
Grapevine, Kentucky
Grapevine, Texas
Grapevine High School
Grapevine Airstrip
Grapevine Canyon
Grapevine Creek
Grapevine Hills
Grapevine Lake
Grapevine Mountains
Grapevine Peak

Other uses 

 Grapevine cross, a major symbol of the Georgian Orthodox Church

See also

 
 
 Grapevine moth (disambiguation)
 Grape (disambiguation)
 Vine (disambiguation)